The Snowdonia Marathon was established in 1982 with the idea of being a dramatic alternative to the numerous city and town races that were becoming so popular.  The route makes a circumnavigation of the Snowdon massif, starting and finishing at Llanberis.  It is held annually in October.

In a 2007 poll by Runner's World Magazine, the Snowdonia Marathon was voted the best marathon in the UK.

Media coverage 
A television highlights show is produced and aired by S4C.
The BBC reports the news and winners on BBC Radio Wales and BBC Radio Cymru.

Results

Men's Race

Women's Race

Half-marathon
Since 2012 there has also been an annual Snowdonia Half Marathon, held in April, and mostly run on roads between Llanrwst, Trefriw and Betws-y-coed.

References

External links
Official website

Marathons in the United Kingdom
Athletics competitions in Wales
1982 establishments in Wales
Snowdonia
Sport in Gwynedd
Autumn events in Wales